Paul Barber may refer to:

 Paul Barber (actor) (born 1951), British actor from Liverpool who played Denzil in Only Fools and Horses
 Paul Barber (field hockey) (born 1955), former British field hockey player and Olympic medal winner
 Paul Barber (soccer administrator), English football administrator
 Paul Barber (bishop) (1935–2021), Bishop of Brixworth
 Paul Barber, a character in the Malayalam film Akkare Akkare Akkare